Central Station was a major station in Louisville, Kentucky. Built in the Richardsonian Romanesque style, it served several railroad companies until the mid-20th century. It was situated at North 7th Street and West River Road, near the Ohio River waterfront, and it was also known as the 7th Street Depot. 

By 1969, only the Chesapeake and Ohio Railway's George Washington remained at the station. That train last called at the station in April 1971. Central Station was demolished in 1972 to make way for Interstate 64. 'Official Guide to the Railways' 1936, index</ref>

The other major station in Louisville was Union Station. There, passenger trains of the Chicago, Indianapolis and Louisville Railroad (Monon), Louisville and Nashville Railroad and Pennsylvania Railroad were served.

Passenger railroads served and significant services
Baltimore and Ohio Railroad
Great Lakes Limited – day train bound for Detroit, via Cincinnati (in the southerly direction from Detroit passengers needed to get a local connection for the trip from Cincinnati to Louisville) 
Cincinnatian – beginning in 1950, this name was reassigned from an eastern itinerary to the Great Lakes Limited route
Night Express night train to Detroit, on same route as the above
local trains to Cincinnati, making connections to the Cincinnatian (Baltimore–Cincinnati), Diplomat (Jersey City – St. Louis) and the National Limited (Jersey City – St. Louis)
Chesapeake and Ohio Railroad
train sections carrying coaches and sleepers of the George Washington and Sportsman to Ashland, Kentucky, making connecting to the main part of those Phoebus, Virginia and Washington, D.C.-bound trains; by the early 1950s those trains were shortened from Phoebus to Newport News. Frankfort, Kentucky and Lexington (Union Station) were also on the Louisville - Ashland route.
Cleveland, Cincinnati, Chicago and St. Louis Railway (absorbed into the New York Central Railroad in 1930)
local trains to Elkhart and South Bend
Illinois Central Railroad 
Irvin S. Cobb – train bound for Fulton, Kentucky, connecting to the Chickasaw train to Memphis, Tennessee, whereupon a connection could be made to the New Orleans–bound Lousiane (previously, in the early 1940s, the Louisiane originated in Louisville, and took the entire route above described for the Irvin S. Cobb, as a secondary originating counterpart to the main train section originating in Chicago)
Kentucky Cardinal – train bound for Memphis, whereupon a connection could be made to the New Orleans–bound Panama Limited (likewise, until the early 1940s, the Creole originated in Louisville, and took the entire route above described for the Creole, as a secondary originating counterpart to the main train section originating in Chicago)

Notes

External links
 Ink drawing of Central Station in its heyday
1932 and 1937 images of Central Station

Former railway stations in Kentucky
Former Baltimore and Ohio Railroad stations
Former Chesapeake and Ohio Railway stations
Former Illinois Central Railroad stations
Former New York Central Railroad stations
Former Southern Railway (U.S.) stations
Transportation buildings and structures in Louisville, Kentucky
Demolished buildings and structures in Kentucky
Buildings and structures demolished in 1972